The 2001 London Marathon was the 21st running of the annual marathon race in London, United Kingdom, which took place on Sunday, 22 April. The elite men's race was won by Morocco's Abdelkader El Mouaziz in a time of 2:07:11 hours and the women's race was won by Ethiopia's Derartu Tulu in 2:23:57.

In the wheelchair races, France's Denis Lemeunier (1:42:37) and Britain's Tanni Grey-Thompson (2:13:55) won the men's and women's divisions, respectively.

Around 92,000 people applied to enter the race, of which 43,517 had their applications accepted and 31,156 started the race. A total of 30,066 runners finished the race, comprising 23,259 men and 6807 women.

Results

Men

Women

Wheelchair men

Wheelchair women

References

Results
Results. Association of Road Racing Statisticians. Retrieved 2020-04-18.

External links

Official website

2001
London Marathon
Marathon
London Marathon